"Soul Passing Through Soul" is a song by British singer Toyah Willcox, released as the second single from her album Minx in 1985 by Portrait Records.

Background 
The song was written by Toyah Willcox and Michael St James, and produced by Christopher Neil. The backing instrumentation of the track mirrors the riff of David Bowie's "'Heroes'" which was performed by Toyah's future husband, Robert Fripp. Released in June 1985, the single failed to enter the UK Top 40, peaking at number 57. It spent three weeks on the UK Singles Chart. The single B-side, "All in a Rage", was also taken from Minx. The extended mix which features on the 12" vinyl was added to the 2005 CD reissue of Minx. The cover photograph was taken by Terence Donovan and pictures Toyah wearing a fiberglass bodice previously sported by Grace Jones.

Music video 
The music video for the song was directed by Jay Williams and pictures Toyah and dancers performing dance routines based on Buddhist prayers and tai chi.

Track listing 
 7" single
A. "Soul Passing Through Soul" (Toyah Willcox, Michael St James) – 3:52
B. "All in a Rage" (Willcox, Joel Bogen) – 3:28

 12" single
A. "Soul Passing Through Soul" (Extended Mix) (Willcox, St James) – 4:48
B1. "Soul Passing Through Soul" (Willcox, St James) – 3:50
B2. "All in a Rage" (Willcox, Bogen) – 3:28

Personnel 
 Toyah Willcox – vocals, backing vocals
 Michael St James – backing vocals
 Christopher Neil – backing vocals
 Andy Brown – bass
 Peter Van Hooke – drums
 Al Hodge – guitar
 Ian Wherry – keyboards
 Frank Ricotti – percussion
 Ray Beavis – saxophone
 John Earle – saxophone

Charts

References

External links 
 Lyrics of this song at Genius
 The official Toyah website

1985 songs
1985 singles
Toyah Willcox songs
Songs written by Toyah Willcox
Portrait Records singles